The Pavilion at Pan Am, originally Pan American Arena, was a twin rink ice hockey and skating arena located in downtown Indianapolis, Indiana, U.S. and part of the broader Pan American Plaza, which was built in commemoration of the 1987 Pan American Games held in Indianapolis.  The arena is now the largest independently own live music venue in Indianapolis operated Indy Pavilion LLC owners Cebronica Luft, Jason Jenkins and Jason Stellema.

The Pavilion at Pan Am was operated by the Indiana/World Skating Academy and has one standard  ice rink (NHL size) and one  ice rink (Olympic Games size). These high quality rinks, coupled with a research center devoted to testing skaters' athletic prowess, has established The Pavilion at Pan Am as a primary training site for striving young hockey players and figure skaters.

Following the suspension of operations by the Indiana/World Skating Academy in April 2013, Pan Am Sports Incorporated assumed day-to-day operational responsibility for the ice rinks at Pan Am Plaza. With the change in management, the facility was also rebranded as Pan Am Pavilion and served as the official training facility of the Indiana Ice, a member of the United States Hockey League, until late 2014.

In 2015, Indy Pavilion LLC took over the facility and rebranded it as the Pavilion at Pan Am, a live events center. To date, the venue has played host to over 600 events and has been a staple to the Indianapolis music scene and Downtown economy.

External links
Official Pavilion at Pan Am website

References

Indoor ice hockey venues in the United States
Music venues in Indiana
Sports venues in Indianapolis
Ice hockey venues in Indiana
Sports venues completed in 1987